Wellawaya is a town located in Monaragala District, Uva Province of Sri Lanka.

History
On 25 August 1630 a major battle took place near Wellawaya between Portuguese forces and the Sinhalese under the command of King Rajasinghe II, which resulted in a complete rout of the Portuguese army.

Wellawaya is where the first armed attack occurred, on 5 April 1971, by the communist Janatha Vimukthi Peramuna (JVP) against the Government of Ceylon, under Prime Minister Sirimavo Bandaranaike.

See also
List of towns in Uva

References

Populated places in Uva Province